Kallikrein-1 is a protein that in humans is encoded by the KLK1 gene. KLK1 is a member of the peptidase S1 family.

Kallikreins are a subgroup of serine proteases having diverse physiological functions. Growing evidence suggests that many kallikreins are implicated in carcinogenesis and some have potential as novel cancer and other disease biomarkers. This gene is one of the fifteen kallikrein subfamily members located in a cluster on chromosome 19. This protein is functionally conserved in its capacity to release the vasoactive peptide, Lys-bradykinin, from low molecular weight kininogen.

See also
 Kinin–kallikrein system
 Kininogen 1

References

Further reading

External links
 The MEROPS online database for peptidases and their inhibitors: S01.160

Proteases
EC 3.1.21